Eldred Township is the name of some places in the U.S. state of Pennsylvania:
Eldred Township, Jefferson County, Pennsylvania
Eldred Township, Lycoming County, Pennsylvania
Eldred Township, McKean County, Pennsylvania
Eldred Township, Monroe County, Pennsylvania
Eldred Township, Schuylkill County, Pennsylvania
Eldred Township, Warren County, Pennsylvania

See also 
 Elder Township, Cambria County, Pennsylvania

Pennsylvania township disambiguation pages